Marcell Harris (born June 9, 1994) is an American football linebacker who is a free agent. He played college football at Florida. Harris had 102 tackles and two interceptions between 2014 and 2016. Due to a torn Achilles tendon, he missed the 2017 season.

Professional career

San Francisco 49ers
Harris was drafted by the San Francisco 49ers in the sixth round (184th overall) of the 2018 NFL Draft. On September 3, 2018, Harris was placed on injured reserve. He was activated off injured reserve to the active roster on November 1, 2018. In Week 16 against the Chicago Bears, Harris made a late hit on Mitchell Trubisky. As a result, he was fined $10,026 six days later.

On August 31, 2019, Harris was waived by the 49ers and was signed to the practice squad the next day. He was promoted to the active roster on October 3, 2019.

During Week 13 against the Baltimore Ravens, Harris forced a fumble on quarterback Lamar Jackson and recovered the football during a narrow 20–17 road loss. The 49ers reached Super Bowl LIV, but lost 31–20 to the Kansas City Chiefs.

Harris signed a one-year contract extension with the 49ers on March 5, 2021.

At the beginning of the 2021 NFL season, it was reported that Harris was making the switch from strong safety to linebacker.

New York Jets
On April 25, 2022, Harris signed with the New York Jets. He was released on November 24 and re-signed to the practice squad.

References

1994 births
Living people
American football safeties
Florida Gators football players
San Francisco 49ers players
Players of American football from Orlando, Florida
New York Jets players